Tal Karp (born 30 December 1981) is an Australian women's former Olympic soccer player who represented Australia as a member of the Matildas (the Australian Women's Football Team) and captained Melbourne Victory in the Australian W-League.

After representing Australia in the 2003 FIFA Women's World Cup and the 2004 Athens Olympic Games, Karp retired from football to focus on a career in the law.

Football career

Early and personal life

Karp was born and raised in Perth, Western Australia, later moved to Melbourne, and is Jewish. Her father was born in Israel.

She began her football career competing in the premier boys leagues in Perth, her hometown. Initially Karp was denied entry to the boys league, however when her brother's team did not have enough players, she was offered a chance to compete. After proving herself and kicking the winning goal of the match, Karp was invited to remain on the team. Karp continued to play in Perth's premier boys league from age 7 until age 17, when she relocated to Canberra.

International career

Karp represented Australia at a youth level as a member of the Australian Under 16 Squad (1995–97), the Australian Under 19 Team (1998), and the Australian Schoolgirls Team (1997, named Fairest and Best).

Karp was first selected to play for the Matildas in 2002 at age 20 for the Matildas' tour to Canada and the US, becoming the first Western Australian field player to play for the Australian team since 1996. During her football career, Karp accumulated 27 'caps' for her country.

Highlights of Karp's career included her performance in the Nike 2002 Women's U.S. Cup and in the FIFA Women's World Cup 2003, throughout which she was a 'starting eleven' player for the Matildas.

Karp was also a member, at the age of 22, of the 2004 Athens Olympic Games Women's Soccer Team, which placed fifth in the Olympic competition.

Club career

Karp competed for her home state of WA in national championships from the age of 11 in under 16 national competition, age 12 in the under 19 age category, and age 14 in senior national competition.

When the Women's National Soccer League was formed, Karp was drafted to play for the Canberra Eclipse (1996). Karp later played for South Australia, (Runner-up League Winners 1997/1998), before returning to the Canberra Eclipse for a further five seasons (League Winners 2001/2002, Julie Dolan Medal runner up 2002). Karp returned to Perth to play for the Western Waves in 2004.

Karp held an Australian Institute of Sport Scholarship from 2002 until the end of 2004, and various state and territory sports scholarships during her club career.

In 2005, Karp retired from football to focus on a career in law. However, in 2008, she returned to the game to captain the Melbourne Victory Women's Team in the inaugural season of the Westfield W-League. Karp also competed for Melbourne Victory in the 2009/10 season.

Legal career
Tal Karp graduated from the Australian National University (ANU) in 2006 with a Bachelor of Laws with First Class Honours and the Blackburn Medal for Research in Law. Karp also completed a Bachelor of Arts (History). Following university, Karp went on to complete her Articles of Clerkship at Mallesons Stephen Jacques (now King and Wood Mallesons) in Melbourne, before undertaking an Associateship with Justice Hayne of the High Court of Australia. Karp has held senior legal practice, policy, strategy and advisory roles and regularly appears as an advocate in complex civil and criminal matters. In 2014, she appeared as junior for Victoria Legal Aid in Victoria's first Guideline Judgment.

Other roles
Karp is a board director of Football Federation Victoria and a member of the Australian Institute of Company Directors. She has previously served as a Tribunal Member for Football Federation Victoria. She is also a qualified coach, holding AFC 'B' Licence Accreditation.

Awards and accolades

Sporting awards
Named 'most valuable player', Under 16 Australian national competition, 1997
Named 'fairest and best player', Australian Schoolgirls Team, 1997 
Julie Dolan Medal runner up, Football Federation Australia, 2002 (awarded to the Most Valuable Australian Women's Football Player)
Australian Institute of Sport Scholarship, 2002-2004
Maccabi Sportswoman of the Year, 2008
Hall of Fame (for contribution to sport) Maccabi Western Australia, 2010
Hall of Fame (for contribution to sport) Maccabi Victoria, 2011

Academic awards
Cindy Sheu Peace and International Friendship Scholarship, 1999
NSW Bar Association Human Rights Prize, 2004
Australian National University, Blackburn Medal for Research in Law, 2005
Chancellors Letter of Commendation for Academic Excellence for advocacy performance for the Australian National University in the Philip C. Jessup International Law Moot Court Competition, 2005

See also

List of select Jewish football (association; soccer) players

References

External links
W-League Team profile

Living people
1981 births
Australian women's soccer players
Australian Jews
Australian people of Israeli descent
Jewish footballers
Sportswomen from Western Australia
Soccer players from Perth, Western Australia
Olympic soccer players of Australia
Footballers at the 2004 Summer Olympics
2003 FIFA Women's World Cup players
Australia women's international soccer players
Melbourne Victory FC (A-League Women) players
A-League Women players
Women's association football midfielders